Self-Portrait in a Group of Friends is an 1824 or 1827 oil on canvas painting by the Italian artist Francesco Hayez, now in the Museo Poldi Pezzoli in Milan. The other people in the painting have been identified as Tommaso Grossi, Giuseppe Molteni, Giovanni Migliara and Pelagio Pelagi.

History
The work is mentioned in Prospetto delle incisioni, quadri e oggetti d'arte a un prezzo d'acquisto (1853) as a "picture by Hayez in oils representing five portraits". It was first exhibited to the public in 1883 as part of a monographic show of the artist's work, but then remained in a private collection until 1996, when it was left to its present owner on the death of Riccardo Lampugnani, who had obtained it from his grandfather Giuseppe Gargantini.

References

Self-portraits
Portraits by Francesco Hayez
Paintings in the collection of the Museo Poldi Pezzoli
Portraits of men
1824 paintings
1827 paintings
Group portraits by Italian artists